Signs may refer to:

Signs (2002 film), a 2002 film by M. Night Shyamalan
 Signs (TV series) (Polish: Znaki) is a 2018 Polish-language television series
Signs (journal), a journal of women's studies
Signs (band), an American reggaeton duet
Signs Gospel, a hypothetical source text for the Gospel of John, according to source criticism
Signs of the Times (magazine), a Seventh-day Adventist magazine published in the U.S. by Pacific Press
Signs of the Times (Australian magazine), the Australian edition of that magazine published by Signs Publishing Company
Signs Publishing Company in Victoria, Australia

Albums
Signs (Badmarsh & Shri album) and its title track, 2001
Signs (Jonny Lang album), 2017
Signs, by Kathryn Tickell, 1993
Signs (Tedeschi Trucks Band album), 2019

Songs
"Signs" (Bloc Party song), 2009
"Signs" (Cardiacs song), 1999
"Signs" (Drake song), 2017
"Signs" (Five Man Electrical Band song), 1970
"Signs" (Snoop Dogg song), 2005
Signs, a song by Beyoncé featuring Missy Elliott from Dangerously in Love, 2003

See also 
"Signes" (song), a 2004 song by Nâdiya
Sign (disambiguation)